NASCAR Heat 5 is a racing video game simulating the 2020 NASCAR season. It was developed by 704Games and was published by Motorsport Games on July 10, 2020, for PlayStation 4, Xbox One and Microsoft Windows via Steam. Chase Elliott is the cover athlete for the standard edition, and Tony Stewart is the cover athlete for the Gold Edition.

Gameplay
Other than a new single-player track testing mode, gameplay remained largely the same as its predecessor, NASCAR Heat 4. Minor tweaks to pit stops, the paint booth and in-race retirements (DNF) were also introduced.

Development and release
After having Monster Games develop the first four installments of the rebooted NASCAR Heat series, publisher 704Games took over development and handed publishing over to Motorsport Games. NASCAR Heat 5 was released on July 7, 2020, for those who pre-ordered the Gold Edition; standard copies of the game were released on July 10. Along with the early release date, the Gold Edition includes bonus spotter voices, paint schemes and career mode opportunities. Additional downloadable content packs were also announced with the release of the game.

A Nintendo Switch port called NASCAR Heat Ultimate Edition+ was quietly listed on Amazon in October 2021, and was released on November 19, 2021. In addition to 2020 content, it also includes drivers and primary paint schemes from the 2021 NASCAR Cup Series season.

Next Gen cars
The Next Gen Cars are scheduled to be included in downloadable content for the PlayStation 4, Xbox One and Steam, updating the game for the 2022 season. Unlike its successor NASCAR 21: Ignition, the DLC is not free, requiring the purchase of individual schemes or the Season Pass.

The DLC has been delayed multiple times and has yet to be released even after the end of the 2022 season due to the team working on an enhanced audio system for the new cars.

Reception

Before its release, Heat 5 was criticized for focusing on minor changes instead of addressing major issues that previous Heat titles had.  Developer 704Games claimed that the approach was due to limitations of legacy code that the game was built on.

Racing series featured

Soundtrack

References

External links
 

2020 video games
NASCAR video games
Nintendo Switch games
PlayStation 4 games
Xbox One games
Windows games
Multiplayer and single-player video games
Racing video games
Split-screen multiplayer games
Video games developed in the United States
Video games set in the United States
Video games set in Canada